Ararat railway station is located on the Serviceton and Western standard gauge lines in Victoria, Australia. It serves the town of Ararat, and it opened on 7 April 1875.

The station serves as the terminus for V/Line's Ararat line services. It is also the junction for the Ararat – Maryborough line.

History

Ararat station opened on 7 April 1875, when the railway line from Ballarat was extended. In December 1877, a line south to Portland opened and, in January 1887, the mainline was extended west, reaching the South Australian border at Serviceton. In 1890, the line to Maryborough opened. Two signal boxes ("A" and "B") opened in 1891 and, in 1914, the goods sidings were extended, with the locomotive depot built soon after.

In the late 1930s, the locomotive depot was expanded, in conjunction with the arrival of the new H class 4-8-4 steam locomotives, intended for use on The Overland passenger train. An  turntable was installed with 24 roads around it, the largest on the Victorian Railways network. Before this time, Stawell was the major servicing facility in the region.

During 1985, the passenger facilities in the main station building were refurbished. However, it was during this time that rationalisation of the facilities began; signal box "B" was demolished in 1984, with the train control office following in 1988. The former footbridge, which was located at the Up end of the station, was destroyed in a derailment in May 1986. The former Mobil siding and associated points and staff lock were abolished in January 1988. The locomotive depot closed in 1989, the train crew depot closed on 30 June 1994, with signal box "A" following in 1996. Gauge conversion also occurred at the station in the 1990s, with the main line to Adelaide converted to standard gauge, as part of the One Nation project. The lines west and south were converted, with the line to Maryborough converted to dual gauge soon after.

In April 1995, services on the former mainline to Ballarat were suspended, and was left as broad gauge. V/Line passenger services westward to Dimboola had earlier been withdrawn on 21 August 1993, with the Ballarat to Ararat service withdrawn on 27 May 1994.

On 11 July 2004, the line to Ballarat was reopened, with V/Line passenger services reinstated. The contract for the works was awarded in February 2003, and required a diamond crossing and signalling to be installed, to allow the broad gauge line to reach the platform. In January 2005, the Maryborough line was booked out of use.

From January 2017, the Ararat line included a stop at Caroline Springs. From December 2019, the line included a stop at Cobblebank.

The Murray Basin Rail Project, which began in 2016, included reopening of the line from Ararat to Maryborough. In early 2018, the line was officially re-opened at Avoca, after more than 13 years of sitting idle.

As part of the Regional Rail Revival project, an extra stabling siding was provided at the station, to accommodate an extra morning service. By early 2021, the project was completed, with a new timetable introduced on 31 January of that year. The stabling yard is able to hold two three-carriage VLocity trains.

Platforms, facilities and services

Ararat has two platforms. The full length standard gauge platform is on the north side, with broad gauge trains using a bay platform on the south side. There is a railway grade crossing approximately 500 metres east of the station, which allows the broad gauge line to continue east towards Beaufort and Ballarat, while the standard gauge line heads south towards Geelong.

Control of signals at the station is by the Australian Rail Track Corporation control centre at Mile End, South Australia, and Centrol, in Melbourne.

A dead end siding is located to the east, used for stabling broad gauge passenger trains, while across from the main platform are two standard gauge loops and one dead end siding.

It is serviced by V/Line Ararat line services on broad gauge, and Journey Beyond The Overland services on standard gauge.

Platform 1:
  Journey Beyond services to Adelaide Parklands and Melbourne (Southern Cross) (two per week)

Platform 2:
  V/Line services to Southern Cross

Transport Links

Ararat Transit operates six routes via Ararat station, under contract to Public Transport Victoria:
 : to Ararat West via Brewster Road
 : to Ararat South via Burke Street
 : to Ararat North via Baird Street
 to Maryborough via Elmhurst and Avoca
 to Hopkins Correctional Centre
 Ararat – Lake Bolac via Willaura

V/Line operates road coach services from Ararat to Ballarat, Warrnambool and Nhill. The Ballarat and Nhill services are operated by Firefly Express.

Gallery

See also
 Avoca railway station, Victoria
 Avoca railway line
 Ben Nevis railway station

References

External links
 Rail Geelong gallery
 Victorian Railway Stations gallery
 When there were Stations gallery
 Melway map at street-directory.com.au

Ararat, Victoria
Railway stations in Australia opened in 1875
Regional railway stations in Victoria (Australia)